William von Wirén ( in Suuresadama, Hiiumaa – 23 November 1956 in Stockholm) was an Estonian sailor who competed in the 1928 Summer Olympics.

In 1928 he was a crew member of the Estonian boat Tutti V which won the bronze medal in the 6 metre class.

He also won gold medal in European Championships in ice yachting in 20 m class in 1933 and 1934 and a bronze medal in International Monotype-XV ice yacht class in 1936.

References 
 

1894 births
1956 deaths
People from Hiiumaa Parish
People from the Governorate of Estonia
Estonian male sailors (sport)
Olympic sailors of Estonia
Olympic bronze medalists for Estonia
Olympic medalists in sailing
Medalists at the 1928 Summer Olympics
Sailors at the 1928 Summer Olympics – 6 Metre